The Hoten Camp was a World War II prisoner of war camp in Manchuria. The camp was located near Mukden (now Shenyang) and was initially called Mukden POW Camp. Archival records indicate 1,420 Allied prisoners were held here, 1,193 of whom were liberated, and 224 of whom did not survive their captivity. Prisoners at the camp included soldiers from the United States, the United Kingdom, the Netherlands, Australia, and New Zealand.

Medical Experimentation 
The camp was associated with Unit 731, a biological weapons group of the Imperial Japanese Army. Poor conditions, lack of food and proper medical attention, in addition to medical experiments were conducted on the POW's at Mukden/Hoten, resulting in many deaths.

Notable Prisoners 
Prisoners detained at the camp included Thomas J. H. Trapnell and Colonel Edwin H. Johnson, as well as former Governor of Hong Kong Mark Aitchison Young.

Robert Peaty (1903–1989), a Major in the Royal Army Ordnance Corps, was the senior ranking allied officer. During his captivity, he kept a secret diary. He was interviewed by the Imperial War Museum in 1981, and the audio recording tape reels are in the IWM's archives. Peaty recounts: “I was reminded of Dante’s Inferno - abandon hope all ye who enter here…”  His diary recorded the regular injections of infectious diseases that were disguised as preventative vaccinations.  His entry for January 30, 1943 notes “Everyone received a 5 cc Typhoid-paratyphoid A inoculation.”  The February 23, 1943 entry read “Funeral service for 142 dead. 186 have died in 5 days, all Americans.”

Liberation 
In August 1945, the camp was liberated by Soviet troops (262nd Rifle Division, 113 Infantry Corps, 39th army) and a small OSS team.

References

External links
 mansell.com
 mukdenpows.org

History of Manchuria
World War II sites of Japan
Japanese prisoner of war and internment camps
1945 disestablishments in China
History of Shenyang
Defunct prisons in China